Turiy Peninsula is peninsula located in Murmansk Oblast, Russia. It is the biggest peninsula on the south of Kola Peninsula. It protrudes into the White Sea, with Sosnovaya Bay to the west, and Karzh Bay to the east.

Sources 
 Map of Turiy peninsula

Peninsulas of Murmansk Oblast